Saltbush Bill's Second Fight is a humorous poem by Australian writer and poet Andrew Barton "Banjo" Paterson. It was first published in The Antipodean in 1897.

Saltbush Bill was one of Paterson's best known characters who appeared in 5 poems: "Saltbush Bill" (1894), "Saltbush Bill's Second Fight" (1897), "Saltbush Bill's Gamecock" (1898), "Saltbush Bill on the Patriarchs" (1903), and "Saltbush Bill, J.P." (1905).

Plot summary

Saltbush Bill is droving his sheep towards Castlereagh and Stingy Smith, the owner of Hard Times Hill station is worried that Bill's sheep will ruin his run.  He chances on a travelling tramp, and finding out the man is a fighter, arranges for him to get Bill into a fight and tells him it's "a five-pound job if you belt him well -- do anything short of kill".  When Bill arrives at the station, the tramp kicks his dog, starts a fight and beats Bill senseless.  Bill has to recuperate for a week from his injuries, after which he and his sheep move on.  It is only later that Stingy Smith comes to realise that he has been duped, and that Bill had arranged it all.

Further publications

 Rio Grande's Last Race and Other Verses by Banjo Paterson (1902)
 Singer of the Bush, A. B. (Banjo) Paterson : Complete Works 1885-1900 edited by Rosamund Campbell and Philippa Harvie (1983)
 A Vision Splendid : The Complete Poetry of A. B. 'Banjo' Paterson (1990)
 The Collected Verse of Banjo Paterson (1992)

See also
 1897 in poetry
 1897 in literature
 1897 in Australian literature
 Australian literature

References 

1897 poems
Poetry by Banjo Paterson
Works originally published in The Antipodean